Longhaven railway station was a railway station in Longhaven, Aberdeen, serving passengers and goods on the line to Boddam. It opened with the branch in 1897.

References

Disused railway stations in Aberdeenshire
Former Great North of Scotland Railway stations
Railway stations in Great Britain opened in 1897
Railway stations in Great Britain closed in 1932